SuperShe Island is a female-owned private island, exclusively for women, located off the coast of the Baltic Sea. The island is administratively located in the town of Raseborg, Finland, while the SuperShe community is global.

Overview
 
The 8.4-acre island was bought by American entrepreneur, Kristina Roth, former owner of the tech consulting company Matisia Consultants. Roth sold her company in 2016 for $65 million in revenue, and purchased the island in 2017 to transform it into a women-only space. The island was open to the SuperShe community on June 23, 2018.
 
The activities offered include yoga, meditation, kayaking, and hiking, as well as motivational talks and discussions. SuperShe Island was formerly the home base of the SuperShe community — consisting of more than 8,000 women from 122 countries at the time — however, it is now headquartered in the U.S.    
 
The island has attracted a lot of media attention worldwide due to the price of a week-long stay being 4,600 euros. In 2018, the prospective guests had to undergo a rigorous selection process, via the organization's website wherein Roth used to look for the guest's personality, which is why some critics labeled the project as “elitist”; however, Roth has rejected the criticism. As of December 2019, the island is only open to active members of the SuperShe App.  
 
After purchase, male construction workers were working on the island to lay lines for power and water and gut renovation. That was the only time men were allowed on the island, besides Roth's close family and friends.

See also 
 Womyn's land
Women's Week Provincetown

References

External links 
Official website

2018 establishments in Finland
Island resorts
Private islands of Europe
Women-only spaces
Women's events
Organisations based in Raseborg
Gulf of Finland
Resorts in Finland